Kim Song-chol is a North Korean politician and officer of the Korean People's Army.

Biography
He served as deputy to the Supreme People's Assembly. He also served as the commander of 105th Armored Corps based in South Hwanghae Province. Following the 3rd WPK Conference he was elected to the Central Committee of the Workers' Party of Korea. He was also elected to the 7th Central Committee in May 2016. He was a member of the funeral committee of Kim Jong-il in December 2011. In 2015 he was member of the funeral committee of Ri Ul-sol. In February 2012 he once again became colonel-general after being demoted some time before that.

References

Living people
Year of birth missing (living people)
Place of birth missing (living people)
North Korean generals
Members of the Supreme People's Assembly
Members of the 8th Central Committee of the Workers' Party of Korea